12 Winter is a 2009 German television film directed by Thomas Stiller which stars Jürgen Vogel and Axel Prahl. The film was produced by Martin Zimmermann and Bettina Brokemper while the screenplay was written Holger Karsten Schmidt. The film is based on the true story of two bank robbers who robbed a series of small banks throughout Germany. The two were pursued by police for more than 12 years before they were captured in August 2002.

Cast
 Jürgen Vogel as Mike Roth
 Axel Prahl as Klaus Starck

Awards
 2010: Nominated for Adolf Grimme Award in the category of "fiction" 
 2010: Nominated for German TV thriller price
 2010: Won Jupiter Award for "Best TV Film"

References

External links
 

German television films
2000s German-language films
2009 television films
2009 films
German-language television shows
Das Erste original programming